Edward Michael Eden (born May 22, 1949) is an American former Major League Baseball (MLB) infielder who played for the Atlanta Braves in  and the Chicago White Sox in .

Amateur career
Eden has the distinction of being the only major leaguer born in Fort Clayton, a former US military base on the Pacific side of the Panama Canal. He attended Southern Illinois University, and as member of the SIU Salukis, was selected third baseman to the All-Tournament Team of the 1971 College World Series. In 1970 and 1971, he played collegiate summer baseball with the Orleans Cardinals of the Cape Cod Baseball League, and won the league's batting title in 1970.

Professional career
Signed by the San Francisco Giants in 1972, Eden was acquired by the Atlanta Braves in 1976 as part of a five-player trade. He appeared in five games with Atlanta in that season before joining the Chicago White Sox in 1978, and also spent part of three seasons in Triple-A with the Iowa Oaks (1978) and Rochester Red Wings (1979–1980).

In two major league seasons, Eden posted a .080 batting average (2-for-25) and scored a run in 15 games. He hit .269 (251-for-932) in 266 minor league games, including 16 home runs, 114 RBI, and a .363 on-base percentage.

See also
1976 Atlanta Braves season
1978 Chicago White Sox season
List of players from Panama in Major League Baseball

References

External links
The Baseball Cube
Baseball Reference
Retrosheet
SIU baseball players

 

1949 births
Living people
Amarillo Giants players
Atlanta Braves players
Chicago White Sox players
Decatur Commodores players
Fresno Giants players
Iowa Oaks players
Major League Baseball infielders
Major League Baseball players from Panama
Orleans Firebirds players
Phoenix Giants players
Richmond Braves players
Rochester Red Wings players
Southern Illinois Salukis baseball players